The 2018–19 Djibouti Premier League was the 31st season of the Djibouti Premier League, the top-tier football league in Djibouti. The season started on 9 November 2018 and ended on 27 April 2019.

Standings

References

Football leagues in Djibouti
Premier League
Premier League
Djibouti